Malayan Bank Chambers, also known as Maybank Chambers and originally known as the Whiteaway Laidlaw Building or the Whiteaway Laidlaw & Co Building, was a building on Battery Road in Singapore.

Description
The building four-storey building did not have a particular style of architecture. The building was fire-proof. The ground floor of the building had a lift and a staircase, both connecting to the first, second and third floors of the building. An 8 ft verandah ran along the building's frontage. The basement was 12,000 sq ft large and 20 ft high. The flooring was made of concrete, and the room was light and airy.

The window fronts were made of teak. The ground floor also contained permanent show cases. The roof of the building was cut in two. The building also had vaulted concrete slabs spanning steel girders with corrugated iron permanent shuttering.

History
The building was constructed in 1915 as the signature department store of Whiteaway Laidlaw in Singapore. The building cost $300,000 to build. The building was designed by London-based architects H. O. Ellis and W. H. Clarke. During the Japanese occupation of Singapore, the building was taken over by the Japanese army, and department store chain Tokyu commenced business in the building.

In 1951, a $2,040,000 bid to take over the building after the expiration of the building's lease in 1963 was rejected. Maybank took over the building for $3.6 million in 1962, renaming it Malayan Bank Chambers, and spent $15 million on upgrading the building. Maybank also spent $7 million on refurbishing the interior of the building, which was done in phases from 1989 to 1994.

On 29 September 1997, Maybank announced plans to redevelop the building for $110 million. The building was demolished in 1998 to make way for the Maybank Tower.

References

Buildings and structures in Singapore
1910s establishments in Singapore
1998 disestablishments in Singapore